Cheshmeh Gach (also Romanized as Cheshmehgach) is a village in Jalalvand Rural District, Firuzabad District, Kermanshah County, Kermanshah Province, Iran. At the 2006 census, its population was 596, in 123 families.

References 

Populated places in Kermanshah County